The men's discus throw event at the 2000 World Junior Championships in Athletics was held in Santiago, Chile, at Estadio Nacional Julio Martínez Prádanos on 20 and 21 October.  A 2 kg (senior implement) discus was used.

Medalists

Results

Final
21 October

Qualifications
20 October

Group A

Group B

Participation
According to an unofficial count, 30 athletes from 26 countries participated in the event.

References

Discus throw
Discus throw at the World Athletics U20 Championships